Chuderhüsi Tower (or "Aussichtsturm Gauchern") is a 42-metre observation tower built of wood at Röthenbach im Emmental, Switzerland. The tower was built in 1998, burnt down in 2001 and was rebuilt in 2002.

External links
 
 Aussichtsturm Chuderhüsi 
 http://www.holz-bois.ch/frames/content.asp?langID=1&lev1ID=42&lev2ID=77&lev3ID=279
 http://skyscraperpage.com/diagrams/?b47493

Buildings and structures in the canton of Bern
Towers in Switzerland
Towers completed in 2002
2002 establishments in Switzerland
21st-century architecture in Switzerland